Shaft is the long-standing vehicle of songwriter Robert Cardy (aka Bob Brannigan), original guitarist for the band The Axemen and a stalwart of the New Zealand underground scene. When the Axemen took a break in 1992, Cardy was jamming with Axemen drummer Stu Kawowski for a while, and one day bumped into guitarist John Segovia at a gas station. Soon after Daniel "Speedy" Mañetto came on board as bass player. This original line-up stayed together for around a year or two, and then one by one Segovia, Mañetto and Kawowski departed. Cardy then put together a more hard-edged version of Shaft with Tony Rush (bass – moved to Wellington and joined The Users) and Rich Mixture (drums – joined The Rock'n'Roll Machine), with former Axel Grinders guitarist John Segovia (who left to form The Radio Kings) joining soon after. Since that time the lineup has changed considerably, with many members coming and going. The current lineup includes Cardy as well as all members of The Situations: Glen Casey (keys), Brad Walkington (guitar), Samuel Kett (bass) and Stuart Kett (drums).

Discography

Albums

Featured compilations
Shaft have appeared on several compilations in New Zealand.  The following is a list of these albums that have featured tracks by Shaft.
 (1996) – But I Can Write Songs Okay (Yellow Eye Records) (EYE005-007) – "The Downhill Racer"
 (2003) – Get A Haircut: 31 of the best New Zealand Rock 'n' Rollers ever! (Zerox) (DZEROX03) – "Playing With Our Selves"
 (2007) – Greetings From New Zealand (a label sampler) Lil' Chief Records (none) – "Pacific Ocean" and "Can You Feel It (Parts I & II)"
 (2012) – These Shaky Isles (a Lil' Chief Records Mixtape) Lil' Chief Records (none) – "Pacific Ocean"

References

External links
Lil' Chief Records: Shaft
Shaft on MySpace
Lil' Chief Records
Shaft profile and extensive discography

Shaft
Shaft